was a town located in Ena District, Gifu Prefecture, Japan.

As of 2003, the town had an estimated population of 7,148 and a density of 84.80 persons per km². The total area was 84.29 km².

On February 13, 2005, Fukuoka, along with the towns of Sakashita and Tsukechi, the villages of Hirukawa, Kashimo and Kawaue (all from Ena District), and the village of Yamaguchi (from Kiso District, Nagano Prefecture), was merged into the expanded city of Nakatsugawa and no longer exists as an independent municipality.

History 
The modern history of Fukuoka dates back to the Meiji era. In 1889, three villages of Fukuoka, Takayama and Tase were incorporated with a new status under the Municipal Act of 1888. Fukuoka merged the village of Shimono in 1897 and was raised to the rank of a town in 1966. The town had four school districts based on these old villages.

References

External links
 Official website of Nakatsugawa 

Dissolved municipalities of Gifu Prefecture
Populated places disestablished in 2005

2005 disestablishments in Japan